The nautical term "stay mouse" refers to an antiquated part of a sailing vessel's standing rigging. On all sailing ships built before about the 19th century, the stays were of natural cords. These lines were looped around the top of each section of the wooden masts using a spliced loop or seized loop in their ends. During the 16th century some riggers began to attach stays by splicing or seizing only a small loop into the end of the stay then passing the rope's tail around the mast and back through the small loop, like a slip-knot.  To prevent this from slipping tightly around the mast when in use, a strong bulge was built into the standing part of the rope that could not fit through the small loop.  This bulge was called a mouse or stay mouse.

As first galvanised and then stainless steel standing rigging replaced natural fibres, and steel and aluminium replaced wood for masts, the need for these niceties died out.  Knowledge of, and interest in, these technologies is kept alive by classic boat and historic ship enthusiasts, as well as by model makers the world over.

References
 Historic Ship Models: Stays 69 Description and some history
 Historic Ship Models: Stays 72 Detail drawings

Sailing rigs and rigging